ABCP may refer to:

 A Band Called Pain (abbreviated ABCP), an American heavy metal band
 Army Body Composition Program, a United States Army program that dictates height and weight standards
 Asset-backed commercial paper
 An alternate name for ABCG2, the human gene ATP-binding cassette, sub-family G (WHITE), member 2
 As built critical path, part of the critical path method algorithm
 Associativity-Based Clustering Protocol, an extension of associativity-based routing